Çağatay is a Turkish masculine name. It is also used as a family name.

Chagatai Khan (Çağatay Han in Turkish) was a son of Genghis Khan. Chagatai ruled the Chagatai Khanate from 1226 to 1242 C.E.

Given name
 Akif Çağatay Kılıç (born 1976), Turkish politician and government minister
 Çağatay Ulusoy (born 1990), Turkish model and actor

Surname
 Ali Rıfat Çağatay (1867–1935), Turkish composer
 Cafer Çağatay (1899–1991), Turkish footballer
 Ergun Çağatay, Turkish photojournalist
 Mustafa Çağatay, former prime minister of Turkish Republic of Northern Cyprus

See also
 Chagatai (disambiguation)
 Chughtai, further information
 Kagatay (disambiguation)

Turkish-language surnames
Turkish masculine given names